The J Awards of 2020 were the sixteenth annual J Awards, established by the Australian Broadcasting Corporation's youth-focused radio station Triple J. 

The eligibility period for releases took place between November 2019 and October 2020.

The winners were announced live on Triple J on 19 November 2020, with Lime Cordiale receiving the Australian Album of the Year Award for their album 14 Steps to a Better You, Archie Roach receiving the Double J Artist of the Year Award, Joey Hunter and Tasman Keith receiving the Australian Video of the Year Award for "Billy Bad Again", JK-47 receiving the Unearthed Artist of the Year Award, and Isol-Aid receiving the Done Good Award.

Awards

Australian Album of the Year

Double J Artist of the Year

Australian Video of the Year

Unearthed Artist of the Year

You Done Good Award
An award to an Australian who has "made an impact on the industry through outstanding achievement, social change or altruistic endeavours".

References

2020 in Australian music
2020 music awards
J Awards